Byron Gilchrist Allen (September 13, 1901 – June 10, 1988) was a Minnesota and Iowa politician who was the first nominee of the Minnesota Democratic–Farmer–Labor Party for governor.

Early life and education 
Born in Laurens, Iowa, Allen attended Iowa State College (now Iowa State University) from 1920 to 1924.

Career 
Allen was a newspaper editor by trade, and served in the Iowa House of Representatives from 1927 to 1933. He unsuccessfully sought election to the U.S. House of Representatives from Iowa in 1940.

In 1944, Allen was the first nominee for governor of Minnesota's newly formed Democratic–Farmer–Labor Party, a merger of the state's Democratic and Farmer–Labor parties. He lost to incumbent Republican governor Edward John Thye.

Allen later served as commissioner of the Minnesota Department of Agriculture from 1955 to 1961 under Governor Orville Freeman, and as assistant U.S. secretary of agriculture from 1961 to 1969, also under Freeman, who was appointed U.S. secretary of agriculture by President John F. Kennedy.

Personal life 
Allen was married to Elsa Ellanora Erickson. He died in Detroit Lakes, Minnesota on June 10, 1988.

References

1901 births
1988 deaths
Members of the Iowa House of Representatives
Minnesota Democrats
Iowa Democrats
American male journalists
People from Laurens, Iowa
State cabinet secretaries of Minnesota
United States Department of Agriculture officials
20th-century American non-fiction writers
20th-century American politicians
20th-century American male writers